Andrei Yershov (born August 22, 1976) is a Russian professional ice hockey defenceman currently playing for HC Arystan in the Kazakhstan Vyschaya Liga. He played in the Russian Superleague for Khimik Voskresensk, HC Lada Togliatti and Vityaz Chekhov.  He was drafted 240th overall in the 1998 NHL Entry Draft by the Chicago Blackhawks.

External links

1976 births
Living people
Chicago Blackhawks draft picks
HC Khimik Voskresensk players
HC Lada Togliatti players
Molot-Prikamye Perm players
Russian ice hockey defencemen
HC Vityaz players
People from Voskresensk
Sportspeople from Moscow Oblast